Hikmet Bayur (also known as Yusuf Hikmet Bayur, 1891–1980) was a Turkish politician. He was born in Istanbul (then known as Constantinople by the Western World). He was the grandson of Kâmil Pasha, one of the Grand Viziers of the Ottoman Empire.

Early life
He graduated from Galatasaray High School in 1908 and from the Faculty of Science of Paris University (Sorbonne) in 1912. After some years in Paris he returned home to teacher at Galatasaray High School in 1912, remaining there until 1920.

Career

War
During the Turkish War of Independence, he joined the Turkish National Movement and fought on the Salihli front. Postwar he was appointed as the director of political affairs. At the end of the war, he was appointed as an adviser to the Turkish delegation to Conference of Lausanne.

Republic
Turkey was proclaimed as the Turkish Republic on October 29, 1923. Bayur was appointed to various embassies and consulatesLondon (1923–1925), Belgrade (1925–1927) and Kabul (1928)before becoming Secretary General of the Presidency.

In the general election of 1935, he was elected as the Republican People's Party (CHP) deputy from the Manisa Province. Between October 27, 1933, and July 9, 1934, he was the Minister of National Education in the 7th government of Turkey.  When Atatürk died on November 10, 1938, İsmet İnönü was elected as the new president. Bayur was the only deputy in parliament who opposed İnönü.

Multiparty period
When the Democrat Party (DP) was founded in 1946, Bayur resigned from the Republican People's Party (CHP) and joined the DP. Following disappointment with the DP, he became one of the charter members of the Nation Party in 1948. Bayour became speaker of the party, before resigning from the Nation Party in 1953 because it was against Kemalism. In the May 2, 1954 and October 27, 1957 elections, he was elected as a DP deputy from Manisa Province. After the 1960 Turkish coup d'etat, Bayur was arrested and then released in 1963. Following his release from prison, he began a career in journalism and started writing for the newspaper Kudret.

He died in Istanbul on March 6, 1980.

Books
1934: Yeni Türkiye Devletinin Harici Siyaseti ("Foreign Policy of the new Turkish State")
1940: Ahval-i Hazıra ("Circumstances of the Present State")
1940–67: Türk İnkılabı Tarihi ("History of the Turkish Revolution")
1946–50: Hindistan Tarihi ("History of India")
1963: Atatürk, Hayatı ve Eserleri ("Atatürk, His Life and His Works")
1974: XX. Yüzyılda Türklüğün Tarih ve Acun Siyasası Üzerindeki Etkileri ("In the twentieth century the influences of Turkism on History and the World")

References

20th-century Turkish journalists
20th-century Turkish diplomats
1891 births
1980 deaths
Democrat Party (Turkey, 1946–1961) politicians
Galatasaray High School alumni
Leaders of political parties in Turkey
Ministers of National Education of Turkey
Nation Party (Turkey, 1948) politicians
Politicians from Istanbul
Republican People's Party (Turkey) politicians
Journalists from Istanbul
University of Paris alumni

Turkish expatriates in France
Ambassadors of Turkey to Afghanistan